Shuzo Matsutani may refer to one of two fictional characters:
 The main character of the Legendz anime, Shuzo "Shu" Matsutani (シュウゾウ・マツタニ Shūzō Matsutani). See: List of Legendz characters
 Shuzo "Shu" Matsutani (松谷 修造 Matsutani Shūzō), the main character of Now and Then, Here and There